A platoon is a military unit of around 15 to 30 soldiers.

Platoon may also refer to:
 Platoon (automobile), a system for reducing traffic congestion
 Platoon (film) (1986), a Vietnam War film directed by Oliver Stone
 Platoon (1987 video game), a video game based on the 1986 Oliver Stone film
 Platoon (2002 video game) (also known as Platoon: The 1st Airborne Cavalry Division in Vietnam), a real time strategy video game based on the 1986 Oliver Stone film
 Platoon system, a technique used in baseball and football
 One-platoon system a technique used in  football

See also
 Platoon Leader (film)
 The Anderson Platoon
 Platoon: Bravo Company